Frau is a German honorific for women.

Frau may also refer to:

 Frau (band), an English all-female hardcore punk band
 Frau Antje, a Dutch advertising character marketed to German audiences
 Frau Ava, the first named female writer in any genre in the German language
 Frau Ella, a 2013 German comedy film 
 Frau Engel,  a character from the Wolfenstein video game series
 Frau Eva, a 1916 German silent drama film
 Frau Farbissina, a character from the Austin Powers film series
 Frau Faust, a Japanese manga series written and illustrated by Kore Yamazakia
 Frau Hitt, a peak within the southernmost mountain chain of the Karwendel in Austria
 Frau Holle, a German fairy tale 
 Frau-Holle-Teich, a pond in Hoher Meißner, Werra-Meißner-Kreis, Hesse, Germany
 Frau im Spiegel, a German weekly magazine for women
 Frau Jenny Treibel, a 1892 German novel published by Theodor Fontane
 Frau Margot, a 2007 opera by composer Thomas Pasatieri.
 Frau Minne, a personification of courtly love in Middle High German literature
 Frâu River, a tributary of the Someşul Mare River
 Frau Sorge, a 1887 novel by Hermann Sudermann
 Frau Sixta, a 1925 novel by Ernst Zahn 
 Frau Trude, the German name for Mother Trudy, a fairy tale collected by the Brothers Grimm
 Die Frau ohne Schatten,  a 1919 opera by Richard Strauss 
 Die schweigsame Frau, a 1935 opera by Richard Strauss 
 Poltrona Frau, Italian furniture manufacturing company
 Wildi Frau, a mountain of the Bernese Alps
 The Men of Frau Clarissa, a 1922 German silent film

See also
 Frau (surname)
 Fräulein, a specific German honorific for unmarried women
 Fraus, the goddess or personification of treachery and fraud in Roman mythology
 Fraus (genus), a genus of moths of the family Hepialidae.